Feminazgûl is an American feminist black metal band from North Carolina. Founded by Margaret Killjoy in 2018, Feminazgûl released their debut EP, The Age of Men Is Over, the same year. The band released their first full-length album, No Dawn for Men, in 2020.

History 
Feminazgûl was founded by Margaret Killjoy, a transgender anarchist author, in 2018. She created the band's debut EP, The Age of Men Is Over, as a solo project the same year. The band was also included in the 2018 Worldwide Organization of Metalheads Against Nazis (W.O.M.A.N.) compilation album. In 2020, the band released their first full-length album, No Dawn for Men, with the addition of Laura Beach as lead vocalist and Meredith Yayanos as violinist and theremin player. Lars Gotrich writing for NPR described the album as "a viciously beautiful piece of feminist black metal". In 2021, Feminazgûl released a split album with Awenden.

The group, which is based in North Carolina, has been described as black metal and atmospheric black metal. The band has been noted for their feminist, anti-fascist, and anarchist beliefs. These beliefs come through in their music, which also often incorporates quotes and themes from mythology and fantasy.

Feminazgûl's name is a reference to "feminazis", a derogatory term for feminists, as well as to the Nazgûl, a group of  controlled by Sauron in J. R. R. Tolkien's Middle-earth. Both of the band's album titles, The Age of Men Is Over and No Dawn for Men, are quotes from The Lord of the Rings.

Band members 

 Margaret Killjoy – multiple instruments, backup vocals
 Laura Beach – harsh vocals
Meredith Yayanos – violin, theremin, backup vocals

Discography

Studio albums 

 No Dawn for Men (2020)

EPs 

 The Age of Men Is Over (2018)

Singles 

 "A Mallacht" (2021)

Other albums 
 Worldwide Organization of Metalheads Against Nazis (compilation album, 2018)
Awenden/Feminazgûl (split album with Awenden, 2021)

References

External links

American black metal musical groups
Anarchist music
Anti-fascist music
Feminist musicians
Musical groups established in 2018